Adib Khan is an Australian novelist of Bangladeshi origin. He moved to Australia in 1973 and obtained an MA from Monash University in 1976. He taught creative writing at Ballarat University, and in 2007 returned to Monash to pursue a PhD.

Khan started writing in his 40s and has published five novels. His first novel, Seasonal Adjustments won the Christina Stead Prize for Fiction, the Book of the Year award in the 1994 NSW Premier′s Literary Awards, and the 1995 Commonwealth Writers' Prize for Best Book, and was also shortlisted for the 1994 Age Book of the Year award.
Solitude of Illusions was shortlisted for the Christina Stead Prize for Fiction, and the Ethnic Affairs Commission Award in the 1997 NSW Premier′s Literary Awards. It won the 1997 Tilly Aston Braille Book of the Year Award.

Novels
 Seasonal Adjustments, Allen & Unwin, 1994, 
 Solitude of Illusions, Allen & Unwin, 1996, 
 The Storyteller, Flamingo, 2000, 
 Homecoming, Flamingo, 2003, 
 Spiral Road, HarperCollins Publishers Limited, 2007,

See also
 Bangladeshi English literature

References

External links
A review of Adib Khan’s “Seasonal Adjustments”,  The Daily Star, Jessica Mudditt, 10 April 2010
 ‘No Better or Worse Than Anyone, But an Equal’: Negotiating Mutuality in Adib Khan’s Seasonal Adjustments (Stefano Mercanti, JASAL, 2012)
 Re-storying the Past, Re-imagining the Future in Adib Khan’s Homecoming and Spiral Road. (Stefano Mercanti, Journal of Postcolonial Writing, 2016: 622-633).

Living people
Writers from Dhaka
20th-century Australian novelists
21st-century Australian novelists
Australian male novelists
Year of birth missing (living people)
Bangladeshi emigrants to Australia
Australian people of Bangladeshi descent
Australian Muslims
Monash University alumni
Academic staff of the Federation University Australia
20th-century Australian male writers
21st-century Australian male writers